The women's pole vault event at the 1999 Pan American Games was held on July 25. It was the first time that this event was contested at the Pan American Games.

Results

References

Athletics at the 1999 Pan American Games
1999
1999 in women's athletics